Caesar Perkins (March 1839 – September 22, 1910) was a member of the Virginia General Assembly, elected in both 1869 and 1887. He represented Buckingham County as a Republican.

Early life 
Caesar Perkins was born into slavery in March 1839. His name is sometimes rendered as Ceasar Perkins. His parents' names were Joseph and Clarcy Mosely, but he used the name "Perkins" because it was the name of his master. It is not known how Perkins was freed from slavery.

He was a Baptist minister.

Political career 
In 1869, Perkins was elected to the Virginia General Assembly, and he was elected again in 1887; in both cases, he represented Buckingham County. In his first election, he defeated candidates from the Conservative Party. He was a Republican. During his first term, he voted to ratify the Fourteenth and Fifteenth Amendments to the United States Constitution, which codified racial equality.

In 1898, Perkins served at the state's Republican convention, which nominated Colonel R. T. Hubard (or Hubbard) for Congress. Hubard denied that Perkins had been promised anything for the nomination. Two years later, Perkins served again at the state's Republican convention, which again nominated Hubard for Congress.

According to a newspaper account in 1904, he was the last-serving black member of the Virginia legislature. The same story, which caricatured what the writers called his "genuine darky dialect" (for instance, rendering part of his speech as "Yawl Democrats [...] is 'bout ter let dis assembly break up widout keepin' yo' promis' ter pass on de licker question"), was reprinted years later in other newspapers.

Death 
Perkins died on September 22, 1910.

See also 
 African-American officeholders during and following the Reconstruction era

References

Citations

Bibliography

Scholarship

Newspapers
 

 
 
 
 

1839 births
1910 deaths
African-American politicians during the Reconstruction Era
African-American state legislators in Virginia
Republican Party members of the Virginia House of Delegates
20th-century African-American people